Christine Song (born June 14, 1991) is an American female professional golfer currently playing on the LPGA Tour and formerly on the Futures Tour.

Personal
Song was born in Burbank, California on June 14, 1991. She resides in Fullerton, California.

Professional
Song turned professional in 2009, and joined the Futures Tour on January 21, 2009.  She played in the 2011 LPGA Championship, but missed the cut.

Professional wins (5)

Symetra Tour wins (5)

External links

Profile at Atlanta Journal Constitution website (archived)

American female golfers
LPGA Tour golfers
Golfers from California
American sportspeople of Korean descent
Sportspeople from Burbank, California
Sportspeople from Fullerton, California
1991 births
Living people
21st-century American women